Lehmanniella is a genus of flowering plants belonging to the family Gentianaceae.

It is native to Colombia and Peru.

The genus name of Lehmanniella is in honour of Friedrich Carl Lehmann (1850–1903), a German Consul to Colombia, mining engineer, amateur botanist and mycologist, and botanical collector.
It was first described and published in H.G.A.Engler & K.A.E.Prantl, Nat. Pflanzenfam. Vol.4 (Issue 2) on page 101 in 1895.

Known species, according to Kew:
Lehmanniella huanucensis 
Lehmanniella splendens

References

Gentianaceae
Gentianaceae genera
Plants described in 1895
Flora of Colombia
Flora of Peru